Ricardo Boiadeiro (18 February 1976) is a former Brazilian football player.

Career 

Boiadeiro started his career in 1997 with Itumbiara. He moved to South Korea to play for Pohang Steelers. In 2001 he played for Olaria in the Campeonato Carioca, scoring 12 goals in 15 matches. He then moved to Palmeiras as a forward. He made 1 appearance in the Campeonato Brasileiro Série A.

References 

1976 births
Living people
Brazilian footballers
Association football forwards

Sociedade Esportiva Palmeiras players
Itumbiara Esporte Clube players
Olaria Atlético Clube players
Pohang Steelers players